Sacro Cuore is the Italian for Sacred Heart and may refer to:

Churches in Italy
Sacro Cuore, Alcamo
Sacro Cuore, Florence
Sacro Cuore, Monza
Sacro Cuore del Suffragio, Rome
Sacro Cuore di Cristo Re, Rome (Basilica)
Sacro Cuore di Gesù, Grosseto (Basilica)
Sacro Cuore di Gesù, Tolentino
Sacro Cuore di Gesù a Castro Pretorio (Basilica)
Sacro Cuore di Gesù agonizzante a Vitinia, Rome
Sacro Cuore di Maria, Rome
Nostra Signora del Sacro Cuore, Rome

Other
Sacro Cuore di Gesù a Vitinia, titulus presbyteralis
Università Cattolica del Sacro Cuore, Italian university
Università Cattolica del Sacro Cuore Schools
Rector of Università Cattolica del Sacro Cuore

See also 
Sacred Heart (disambiguation)
Sacré Cœur (disambiguation)